Personal Flight was an American aircraft manufacturer based in Kent, Washington and later Chelan, Washington. The company specialized in the design and manufacture of ultralight trikes, paramotors and powered parachutes in the form of kits for amateur construction including for the US FAR 103 Ultralight Vehicles rules.

The company went out of business at the end of 2003.

The company produced a diverse series of ultralight aircraft in the late 1990s, included the Personal Flight Sky-Tender, an ultralight trike flying boat, the Personal Flight Sky-Bike, a paramotor and the conversion of that model to a powered parachute, by the addition of a wheeled carriage as the Personal Flight Sky-Bike Trike.

Personal Flight also acted as an importer and dealer for La Mouette hang gliders and Cosmos ULM ultralight trikes.

Aircraft

References

External links
 - former location
Company website archives on Archive.org

Defunct aircraft manufacturers of the United States
Ultralight aircraft
Homebuilt aircraft
Ultralight trikes
Paramotors
Powered parachutes
Companies based in Kent, Washington
Companies based in Chelan County, Washington